Manohari may refer to:

 Manohari, Uttar Pradesh, a village in Uttar Pradesh
 Manohari, Katihar district, a village in Katihar district, Bihar
 Manohari, Aurangabad district, a village in Aurangabad district, Bihar
 "Manohari" (song), a Telugu-language song from the 2015 film Baahubali: The Beginning